ILS Oy (formerly Insinööritoimisto Lehtonen & Siirilä Oy) is a Finnish engineering company that specializes in winter navigation and the design and development of ice-class ships.

The company was involved in the building of an eco-friendly icebreaker Polaris, which entered service in early 2017.

References 

Shipbuilding companies of Finland
Engineering companies of Finland